David Lewis (died 1872) was a former MP in Wales, representing Carmarthen constituency.

He was elected in the 1835 general election, narrowly defeating the sitting Whig member, William Henry Yelverton. Lewis was defeated in the next election in 1837. He never contributed in parliament.

References

1872 deaths
Members of the Parliament of the United Kingdom for Carmarthenshire constituencies
UK MPs 1835–1837
Conservative Party (UK) MPs for Welsh constituencies
People from Carmarthen